The Center of Science and Technological Studies No. 2 "Miguel Bernard", (CECyT 2), is a high school belonging to National Polytechnic Institute (IPN), located in Mexico City.

Name 

The CECyT 2 has had different names since its inception. The first of the first names that this institution would adopt is Pre-vocational School 2 of Arts and Crafts, later the name would be changed to Vocational School of Mechanical and Electrical Engineering (EVIME). 

Around 1960, it acquired the Professional School of Engineering and Physical-Mathematical Sciences, these names would give rise to know these schools as "vocational" or "voca". In 1972 the name would radically change, becoming the Center for Scientific and Technological Studies No. 2, four years later the name of an illustrious person in the history of the IPN, the engineer Miguel Bernard Perales, was added.

History

Antecedentes 
In 1936, the Centro Industrial de Trabajadores (Workers' Industrial Center) was established. In 1960, as part of a reorganization of programs, four new Vocational Schools of Engineering and Physical and Mathematical Sciences were created, each educating students for two years. In 1972, the vocational schools began serving students for three years and were redesignated as Centers of Science and Technological Studies (Centro de Estudios Científicos y Tecnológicos, CECyT).

In 1974, the General Technical Advisory Council of the IPN approved the renaming of the CECyT schools after historic figures; CECyT 2 was named for Miguel Bernard Perales, who was the director general of the IPN in 1937 and 1938.

In 2011, a new aeronautical lab was dedicated at CECyT 2, named for Elsa Carmina Cortés Vorrath, the first female pilot in the Mexican Navy.

In 2018 the school turned 80 years old with which a series of events were held which ended with the placement of a commemorative plaque in Plaza Osoriona.

1968 Student Movement 
In the Plaza de La Ciudadela –the same place that 55 years before was covered with corpses during the so-called Tragic Ten–, in the center of Mexico City, students from the Isaac Ochoterena High School (incorporated into the UNAM) and from the vocational schools 2 and 5 of the National Polytechnic Institute (IPN) dispute an American football game and, at one point, spurred on by members of two gangs –Los spiders and Los Ciudadelos–, they stage a brawl.

Subsequently, the facilities of Isaac Ochoterena High School, located on the corner of Lucerna and Versalles, a few blocks from La Ciudadela, are attacked by polytechnic students and suffer damage. The police do not intervene.

Tuesday July 23 The students of Isaac Ochoterena, in revenge, stone Voca 2. In response, those of Voca 2 and 5 march to it to settle accounts with their adversaries.

IPN students, led by leaders of the National Federation of Technical Students (FNET), of a pro-government court, meet with Rodolfo González Guevara, secretary general of the Department of the Federal District, to announce that the following day they will hold a march in protest against the police aggression against Voca students 5.

In the Faculty of Political and Social Sciences of the UNAM, during the development of an assembly, the students surprise a military policeman with printed flyers of the Faculty of Philosophy, students' homes and dates of meetings in support of the hunger strike that carries out Demetrio Vallejo, leader of the railroad workers.

80 years putting technology at the service of the country 
The year 2016 marked the 80th anniversary of the study center, different activities were organized to celebrate the commemorative date, a meeting of the first Cheyennes was held, an exhibition in the school gallery of photos that remembered the memory of the high school, including in Collective Transportation System put into circulation a commemorative ticket for the anniversary of CECyT 2.

Coat of arms 
The current shield dates from the sixties, this insignia integrates different elements which are described below:

The gear: Represents engineering and mechanical industry.

The metallic column and rays: Represents the symbol of electrical engineering.

The terrestrial globe: Represents the reception area for aspiring students to the CECyT.

The number 2: It indicates the number assigned to the institution.

The letter V: Represents the vocational symbol.

The acronyms: CECyT indicate the acronym of the school.

Programs 

The CECYT 2 "Miguel Bernard Perales" offers 7 technical degrees in mathematics and physical sciences:

 Technician in Aeronautics
 Technician in Computer-Aided Drawing
 Technician in Digital Graphic Design
 Technician in Metallurgy
 Technician in Machines and Automated Systems
 Technician in Automotive Systems 
Technician in Mechatronics

Academies 

The school is organized in academies that direct the different disciplines that are implemented.

 Academy of Mathematics: Magdalena Téllez.
Academy of Physics: Alejandro Ramírez.
Academy of Basic Sciences: Miguel Aguilar Matehuala.
Academy of Biology: Dolores Camargo.
Academy of Chemistry: José Nelson Moheyer Negrete.
English Academy: Tania Silva Hernández.

References

External links 

 Official website of the IPN
 Official website of CECYT 2

Schools in Mexico City
Instituto Politécnico Nacional